Thomas Enqvist and Magnus Larsson were the defending champions, but did not participate this year.

Donald Johnson and Francisco Montana won the title, defeating Mark Keil and T.J. Middleton 6–4, 3–6, 6–3 in the final.

Seeds

  Yevgeny Kafelnikov /  Daniel Vacek (semifinals)
  Donald Johnson /  Francisco Montana (champions)
  Tomás Carbonell /  Francisco Roig (quarterfinals)
  Tom Nijssen /  Jeff Tarango (first round)

Draw

Draw

External links
 Main Draw on ATP Archive

Open 13
1998 ATP Tour